This is a complete list of South Korean films that received a domestic theatrical release in 2008.

Source for release dates and box-office admission results (except where cited otherwise): Koreanfilm.org.

Box office
The highest-grossing South Korean films released in 2008, by domestic box office gross revenue, are as follows:

Released

Notes and references

See also 
 2008 in South Korea
 2008 in South Korean music
 List of 2008 box office number-one films in South Korea

External links 

 Theatrical Releases in 2008 at Koreanfilm.org

2008
South Korean
Box